Ivan Sesar (born 29 August 1989) is a Bosnian professional footballer who plays as a midfielder for Kvik Halden.

Club career
He joined Kvik Halden in 2021.

International career
Sesar made his international debut for Bosnia and Herzegovina national football team in an unofficial friendly against Poland in Antalya on 16 December 2011. His official debut came on 15 August 2012 against Wales.

International appearances

Career statistics

Last Update: 1 August 2014

Honours
Koper 
Slovenian PrvaLiga: 2009–10
Slovenian Supercup: 2010

Široki Brijeg 
Bosnian Cup: 2016–17

References

External links

1989 births
Living people
Sportspeople from Mostar
Croats of Bosnia and Herzegovina
Association football midfielders
Bosnia and Herzegovina footballers
Bosnia and Herzegovina under-21 international footballers
Bosnia and Herzegovina international footballers
NK Zagreb players
FC Koper players
NK Lokomotiva Zagreb players
FK Sarajevo players
Elazığspor footballers
Akhisarspor footballers
FC DAC 1904 Dunajská Streda players
NK Široki Brijeg players
ASC Daco-Getica București players
FC Inter Turku players
FC Voluntari players
FK Tuzla City players
NK Solin players
NK Rudeš players
Kvik Halden FK players
Croatian Football League players
Slovenian PrvaLiga players
Premier League of Bosnia and Herzegovina players
Süper Lig players
Slovak Super Liga players
Liga I players
Veikkausliiga players
First Football League (Croatia) players
Bosnia and Herzegovina expatriate footballers
Expatriate footballers in Croatia
Bosnia and Herzegovina expatriate sportspeople in Croatia
Expatriate footballers in Slovenia
Bosnia and Herzegovina expatriate sportspeople in Slovenia
Expatriate footballers in Turkey
Bosnia and Herzegovina expatriate sportspeople in Turkey
Expatriate footballers in Slovakia
Bosnia and Herzegovina expatriate sportspeople in Slovakia
Expatriate footballers in Romania
Bosnia and Herzegovina expatriate sportspeople in Romania
Expatriate footballers in Finland
Bosnia and Herzegovina expatriate sportspeople in Finland
Expatriate footballers in Norway
Bosnia and Herzegovina expatriate sportspeople in Norway